The Denza N8 and the original Denza X is a mid-size crossover SUV, The original Denza X was first launched in Guangzhou Auto Show 2019 by Denza, originally a joint venture between Chinese automaker BYD Auto and German luxury car brand Mercedes-Benz.

The Denza X was sold from 2019 to 2021 as a restyled second generation BYD Tang and after Mercedes-Benz withdrew from the joint venture, the Denza X was replaced by the Denza N8 as a major facelift. 
According to Denza, the "N" from the N8 means "New era of intelligence" and "unlimited driving control". Indicating that the N7 and N8 will have an advanced driving assist system. The updated Denza product series consisted of five product types named with D, E, N, Z, and A, forming the name DENZA. The D series is the MPV line with the Denza D9 MPV being the first to be introduced to the market, and the N series is the crossover SUV line, while The other series will include sedans and coupes. 



Denza X (2019–2021)

The Denza X was originally introduced at the Guangzhou Auto Show as the Denza Concept X. The concept version is 7-seat crossover SUV based on the second generation BYD Tang. The Denza X will be available from early 2020 in two versions including an all-electric variant and a plug-in hybrid version.

The production Denza X was launched in two versions just as planned, including an all-electric and a plug-in hybrid (PHEV). According to the plan, the PHEV version will cost 319,800 Chinese yuan and the all-electric one will cost 289,800 Chinese yuan when starting production and sales. Design was announced to be done by the Mercedes-Benz design team.

Denza N8 (2023)
The Denza N8 is essentially the facelift version of the previous Denza X, and is reintroduced as a five- to seven-seater large crossover SUV expected to unveil in 2023. It is said that the Denza N8 would adopt the DM-p hybrid technology plus the e-platform 3.0 structure.

References

External links

Denza Automobile Official Website

X
Plug-in hybrid vehicles
Hybrid sport utility vehicles
Partial zero-emissions vehicles
Cars introduced in 2019
Production electric cars